Samuel Dennis Warren (1852 – February 18, 1910), also Samuel Dennis Warren II, was an American attorney from Boston, Massachusetts.

Biography
Warren was born in 1852. His father was also named Samuel D. Warren, known as S.D. Warren, who founded the Cumberland Paper Mills in Maine. He had four siblings: Cornelia Lyman Warren, philanthropist; Henry Clarke Warren (1854-1899), scholar of Sanskrit and Pali; Edward Perry Warren (1860-1928), art collector; Fredrick Fiske Warren (1862-1938), political radical and utopist.
He graduated from Harvard College in 1875 and graduated second in his class at Harvard Law School in 1877. The first-place student was his friend Louis Brandeis, later a justice of the United States Supreme Court. Warren was editor of the Harvard Crimson. Warren and Brandeis founded the prominent Boston law firm of Nutter McClennen & Fish in 1879. At the end of 1890 they published their famous law review article "The Right to Privacy" in the Harvard Law Review.  It is "one of the most influential essays in the history of American law" and is widely regarded as the first publication in the United States to advocate a right to privacy, articulating that right primarily as a "right to be let alone" which referred to paragraph 11 of the 1868 law of the press of France. Brandeis later acknowledged that the idea for the essay originated with Warren's "deep-seated abhorrance of the invasions of social privacy" on the part of the press.

In 1883, he married Mabel Bayard, daughter of Thomas F. Bayard, U.S. Senator from Delaware from 1869 to 1885. They had six children.

In 1899, he left law to oversee the family's paper production business. He managed the family trust established in May 1889 with the legal assistance of Brandeis to benefit his father's widow and 5 children. In 1906, Warren's brothers Edward and Fiske charged that Brandeis had structured the trust to benefit Samuel at the expense of his siblings. The dispute ended with Samuel's suicide in 1910. The Warren Trust case became a point of contention during the 1916 Senate hearings on the confirmation of Brandeis to the Supreme Court and it remains important for its explication of legal ethics and professional responsibility.

Warren served from 1902 to 1906 as president of the trustees of the Museum of Fine Arts, Boston.

He committed suicide in Dedham, Massachusetts, on February 18, 1910. His family disguised his suicide and the date of his death. The New York Times reported that he died of apoplexy on February 20.

References

External links

 
 
 Louis Brandeis & Samuel Warren," The Right to Privacy," 4 Harvard Law Review 193-220 (1890-91)
  Nutter McClennen & Fish LLP, the law firm founded by Brandeis and Warren
Samuel Dennis Warren at FindAGrave.com

1852 births
1910 deaths
Harvard Law School alumni
Massachusetts lawyers
Lawyers from Boston
Harvard College alumni
19th-century American lawyers
1910 suicides